The Municipality of Škofljica is a municipality in central Slovenia. The seat of the municipality is the town of Škofljica. It lies just south of the capital Ljubljana in the traditional region of Lower Carniola. It is now included in the Central Slovenia Statistical Region.

Settlements
In addition to the municipal seat of Škofljica, the municipality also includes the following settlements:

 Dole pri Škofljici
 Drenik
 Glinek
 Gorenje Blato
 Gradišče
 Gumnišče
 Klada
 Lanišče
 Lavrica
 Orle
 Pijava Gorica
 Pleše
 Reber pri Škofljici
 Smrjene
 Vrh nad Želimljami
 Zalog pri Škofljici
 Želimlje

References

External links

Municipality of Škofljica on Geopedia
Škofljica municipal site

 
1994 establishments in Slovenia
Škofljica